Sinazeze (also known as Sinazezi) is a community located in Sinazongwe District in the Southern Province of Zambia. Its location at a road junction has led to its development.

The Collum coal mine is located near the community.

References

Populated places in Southern Province, Zambia